Kathir College of Engineering is an engineering college located in Neelambur Avinashi Road, Coimbatore in Tamil Nadu, India. The college has been approved by the All India Council for Technical Education and is affiliated to Anna University, Chennai.

The Kathir College of Engineering was established under the patronage of Lamika Educational and Charitable Trust in 2008 in Coimbatore under the ownership of E.S. Kathir S/O K.A.Sengottaiyan (Former Minister of School Education, Government of Tamil Nadu) The colleges offers five undergraduate and five postgraduate courses.

References
{https://www.kathir.ac.in}

External links
 

Engineering colleges in Coimbatore
Colleges affiliated to Anna University
Educational institutions established in 2008
2008 establishments in Tamil Nadu